The Eocene Epoch is a geological epoch that lasted from about 56 to 33.9 million years ago (mya). It is the second epoch of the Paleogene Period in the modern Cenozoic Era.

The Eocene spans the time from the end of the Paleocene Epoch to the beginning of the Oligocene Epoch. The start of the Eocene is marked by a brief period in which the concentration of the carbon isotope 13C in the atmosphere was exceptionally low in comparison with the more common isotope 12C. The end is set at a major extinction event called the Grande Coupure (the "Great Break" in continuity) or the Eocene–Oligocene extinction event, which may be related to the impact of one or more large bolides in Siberia and in what is now Chesapeake Bay. As with other geologic periods, the strata that define the start and end of the epoch are well identified, though their exact dates are slightly uncertain.

Etymology
The term "Eocene" is derived from Ancient Greek  eos meaning "dawn", and  kainos meaning "new" or "recent", as the epoch saw the dawn of recent, or modern, life.

Scottish geologist Charles Lyell (ignoring the Quaternary) had divided the Tertiary Epoch into the Eocene, Miocene, Pliocene, and New Pliocene (Holocene) Periods in 1833. British geologist John Phillips had proposed the Cenozoic in 1840 in place of the Tertiary, and Austrian paleontologist Moritz Hörnes had introduced the Paleogene for the Eocene and Neogene for the Miocene and Pliocene in 1853. After decades of inconsistent usage, the newly formed International Commission on Stratigraphy (ICS), in 1969, standardized stratigraphy based on the prevailing opinions in Europe: the Cenozoic Era subdivided into the Tertiary and Quaternary sub-eras, and the Tertiary subdivided into the Paleogene and Neogene periods. In 1978, the Paleogene was officially defined as the Paleocene, Eocene, and Oligocene epochs; and the Neogene as the Miocene and Pliocene epochs. In 1989, Tertiary and Quaternary were removed from the time scale due to the arbitrary nature of their boundary, but Quaternary was reinstated in 2009, which may lead to the reinstatement of the Tertiary in the future.

Geology

Boundaries
The beginning of the Eocene is marked by the Paleocene–Eocene Thermal Maximum, a short period of intense warming and ocean acidification brought about by the release of carbon en masse into the atmosphere and ocean systems, which led to a mass extinction of 30–50% of benthic foraminifera–single-celled species which are used as bioindicators of the health of a marine ecosystem—one of the largest in the Cenozoic. This event happened around 55.8 mya, and was one of the most significant periods of global change during the Cenozoic.

The end of the Eocene was marked by the Eocene–Oligocene extinction event, also known as the Grande Coupure.

Stratigraphy
The Eocene is conventionally divided into early (56–47.8 million years ago), middle (47.8–38m), and late (38–33.9m) subdivisions. The corresponding rocks are referred to as lower, middle, and upper Eocene. The Ypresian Stage constitutes the lower, the Priabonian Stage the upper; and the Lutetian and Bartonian stages are united as the middle Eocene.

Palaeogeography and tectonics 
During the Eocene, the continents continued to drift toward their present positions.

At the beginning of the period, Australia and Antarctica remained connected, and warm equatorial currents may have mixed with colder Antarctic waters, distributing the heat around the planet and keeping global temperatures high. When Australia split from the southern continent around 45 Ma, the warm equatorial currents were routed away from Antarctica. An isolated cold water channel developed between the two continents. However, modeling results call into question the thermal isolation model for late Eocene cooling, and decreasing carbon dioxide levels in the atmosphere may have been more important. Once the Antarctic region began to cool down, the ocean surrounding Antarctica began to freeze, sending cold water and icefloes north and reinforcing the cooling.

The northern supercontinent of Laurasia began to fragment, as Europe, Greenland and North America drifted apart.

In western North America, the Laramide Orogeny came to an end in the Eocene, and compression was replaced with crustal extension that ultimately gave rise to the Basin and Range Province. Huge lakes formed in the high flat basins among uplifts, resulting in the deposition of the Green River Formation lagerstätte.

At about 35 Ma, an asteroid impact on the eastern coast of North America formed the Chesapeake Bay impact crater.

In Europe, the Tethys Sea finally disappeared, while the uplift of the Alps isolated its final remnant, the Mediterranean, and created another shallow sea with island archipelagos to the north. Though the North Atlantic was opening, a land connection appears to have remained between North America and Europe since the faunas of the two regions are very similar.

Eurasia was separated in three different landmasses 50 million years ago; Western Europe, Balkanatolia and Asia. About 40 million years ago, Balkanatolia and Asia were connected, while Europe was connected 34 million years ago.

India collided with Asia, folding to initiate formation of the Himalayas. India collided with the Kohistan–Ladakh Arc around 50.2 million years ago and with Karakoram around 40.4 million years ago, with the final collision between Asia and India occurring ~40 million years ago.

Climate 
The Eocene Epoch contained a wide variety of different climate conditions that includes the warmest climate in the Cenozoic Era, and arguably the warmest time interval since the Permian-Triassic mass extinction and Early Triassic, and ends in an icehouse climate. The evolution of the Eocene climate began with warming after the end of the Paleocene–Eocene Thermal Maximum (PETM) at 56 million years ago to a maximum during the Eocene Optimum at around 49 million years ago. Recent study show elevation-dependent temperature changes during the Eocene hothouse. During this period of time, little to no ice was present on Earth with a smaller difference in temperature from the equator to the poles. Because of this the maximum sea level was 150 meters higher than current levels. Following the maximum was a descent into an icehouse climate from the Eocene Optimum to the Eocene-Oligocene transition at 34 million years ago. During this decrease, ice began to reappear at the poles, and the Eocene-Oligocene transition is the period of time where the Antarctic ice sheet began to rapidly expand.

Atmospheric greenhouse gas evolution 
Greenhouse gases, in particular carbon dioxide and methane, played a significant role during the Eocene in controlling the surface temperature. The end of the PETM was met with very large sequestration of carbon dioxide into the forms of methane clathrate, coal, and crude oil at the bottom of the Arctic Ocean, that reduced the atmospheric carbon dioxide. This event was similar in magnitude to the massive release of greenhouse gasses at the beginning of the PETM, and it is hypothesized that the sequestration was mainly due to organic carbon burial and weathering of silicates. For the early Eocene there is much discussion on how much carbon dioxide was in the atmosphere. This is due to numerous proxies representing different atmospheric carbon dioxide content. For example, diverse geochemical and paleontological proxies indicate that at the maximum of global warmth the atmospheric carbon dioxide values were at 700–900 ppm while other proxies such as pedogenic (soil building) carbonate and marine boron isotopes indicate large changes of carbon dioxide of over 2,000 ppm over periods of time of less than 1 million years. Sources for this large influx of carbon dioxide could be attributed to volcanic out-gassing due to North Atlantic rifting or oxidation of methane stored in large reservoirs deposited from the PETM event in the sea floor or wetland environments. For contrast, today the carbon dioxide levels are at 400 ppm or 0.04%.

At about the beginning of the Eocene Epoch (55.8–33.9 million years ago) the amount of oxygen in the earth's atmosphere more or less doubled.

During the early Eocene, methane was another greenhouse gas that had a drastic effect on the climate. The warming effect of one ton of methane dimensions unspecified is approximately 30 times the warming effect of one ton of carbon on a 100-year scale (i.e., methane has a global warming potential of 29.8±11). Most of the methane released to the atmosphere during this period of time would have been from wetlands, swamps, and forests. The atmospheric methane concentration today is 0.000179% or 1.79 ppmv. As a result of the warmer climate and the sea level rise associated with the early Eocene, more wetlands, more forests, and more coal deposits would have been available for methane release. If we compare the early Eocene production of methane to current levels of atmospheric methane, the early Eocene would have produced triple the amount of methane. The warm temperatures during the early Eocene could have increased methane production rates, and methane that is released into the atmosphere would in turn warm the troposphere, cool the stratosphere, and produce water vapor and carbon dioxide through oxidation. Biogenic production of methane produces carbon dioxide and water vapor along with the methane, as well as yielding infrared radiation. The breakdown of methane in an atmosphere containing oxygen produces carbon monoxide, water vapor and infrared radiation. The carbon monoxide is not stable, so it eventually becomes carbon dioxide and in doing so releases yet more infrared radiation. Water vapor traps more infrared than does carbon dioxide.

The middle to late Eocene marks not only the switch from warming to cooling, but also the change in carbon dioxide from increasing to decreasing. At the end of the Eocene Optimum, carbon dioxide began decreasing due to increased siliceous plankton productivity and marine carbon burial. At the beginning of the middle Eocene an event that may have triggered or helped with the draw down of carbon dioxide was the Azolla event at around 49 million years ago. With the equable climate during the early Eocene, warm temperatures in the arctic allowed for the growth of azolla, which is a floating aquatic fern, on the Arctic Ocean. Compared to current carbon dioxide levels, these azolla grew rapidly in the enhanced carbon dioxide levels found in the early Eocene. As these azolla sank into the Arctic Ocean, they became buried and sequestered their carbon into the seabed. This event could have led to a draw down of atmospheric carbon dioxide of up to 470 ppm. Assuming the carbon dioxide concentrations were at 900 ppmv prior to the Azolla Event they would have dropped to 430 ppmv, or 30 ppmv more than they are today, after the Azolla Event. Another event during the middle Eocene that was a sudden and temporary reversal of the cooling conditions was the Middle Eocene Climatic Optimum (MECO). At around 41.5 million years ago, stable isotopic analysis of samples from Southern Ocean drilling sites indicated a warming event for 600,000 years. A sharp increase in atmospheric carbon dioxide was observed with a maximum of 4,000 ppm: the highest amount of atmospheric carbon dioxide detected during the Eocene. The main hypothesis for such a radical transition was due to the continental drift and collision of the India continent with the Asia continent and the resulting formation of the Himalayas. Another hypothesis involves extensive sea floor rifting and metamorphic decarbonation reactions releasing considerable amounts of carbon dioxide to the atmosphere. Another hypothesis still implicates a diminished negative feedback of silicate weathering as a result of continental rocks having become less weatherable during the warm Early and Middle Eocene, allowing volcanically released carbon dioxide to persist in the atmosphere for longer.

At the end of the Middle Eocene Climatic Optimum, cooling and the carbon dioxide drawdown continued through the late Eocene and into the Eocene–Oligocene transition around 34 million years ago. Multiple proxies, such as oxygen isotopes and alkenones, indicate that at the Eocene–Oligocene transition, the atmospheric carbon dioxide concentration had decreased to around 750–800 ppm, approximately twice that of present levels.

Early Eocene and the equable climate problem 
One of the unique features of the Eocene's climate as mentioned before was the equable and homogeneous climate that existed in the early parts of the Eocene. A multitude of proxies support the presence of a warmer equable climate being present during this period of time. A few of these proxies include the presence of fossils native to warm climates, such as crocodiles, located in the higher latitudes, the presence in the high latitudes of frost-intolerant flora such as palm trees which cannot survive during sustained freezes, and fossils of snakes found in the tropics that would require much higher average temperatures to sustain them. Relative to present-day values, bottom water temperatures are  higher according to isotope proxies. With these bottom water temperatures, temperatures in areas where deep water forms near the poles are unable to be much cooler than the bottom water temperatures.

An issue arises, however, when trying to model the Eocene and reproduce the results that are found with the proxy data. Using all different ranges of greenhouse gasses that occurred during the early Eocene, models were unable to produce the warming that was found at the poles and the reduced seasonality that occurs with winters at the poles being substantially warmer. The models, while accurately predicting the tropics, tend to produce significantly cooler temperatures of up to  colder than the actual determined temperature at the poles. This error has been classified as the “equable climate problem”. To solve this problem, the solution would involve finding a process to warm the poles without warming the tropics. Some hypotheses and tests which attempt to find the process are listed below.

Large lakes 
Due to the nature of water as opposed to land, less temperature variability would be present if a large body of water is also present. In an attempt to try to mitigate the cooling polar temperatures, large lakes were proposed to mitigate seasonal climate changes. To replicate this case, a lake was inserted into North America and a climate model was run using varying carbon dioxide levels. The model runs concluded that while the lake did reduce the seasonality of the region greater than just an increase in carbon dioxide, the addition of a large lake was unable to reduce the seasonality to the levels shown by the floral and faunal data.

Ocean heat transport 
The transport of heat from the tropics to the poles, much like how ocean heat transport functions in modern times, was considered a possibility for the increased temperature and reduced seasonality for the poles. With the increased sea surface temperatures and the increased temperature of the deep ocean water during the early Eocene, one common hypothesis was that due to these increases there would be a greater transport of heat from the tropics to the poles. Simulating these differences, the models produced lower heat transport due to the lower temperature gradients and were unsuccessful in producing an equable climate from only ocean heat transport.

Orbital parameters 
While typically seen as a control on ice growth and seasonality, the orbital parameters were theorized as a possible control on continental temperatures and seasonality. Simulating the Eocene by using an ice free planet, eccentricity, obliquity, and precession were modified in different model runs to determine all the possible different scenarios that could occur and their effects on temperature. One particular case led to warmer winters and cooler summer by up to 30% in the North American continent, and it reduced the seasonal variation of temperature by up to 75%. While orbital parameters did not produce the warming at the poles, the parameters did show a great effect on seasonality and needed to be considered.

Polar stratospheric clouds 
Another method considered for producing the warm polar temperatures were polar stratospheric clouds. Polar stratospheric clouds are clouds that occur in the lower stratosphere at very low temperatures. Polar stratospheric clouds have a great impact on radiative forcing. Due to their minimal albedo properties and their optical thickness, polar stratospheric clouds act similar to a greenhouse gas and traps outgoing longwave radiation. Different types of polar stratospheric clouds occur in the atmosphere: polar stratospheric clouds that are created due to interactions with nitric or sulfuric acid and water (Type I) or polar stratospheric clouds that are created with only water ice (Type II).

Methane is an important factor in the creation of the primary Type II polar stratospheric clouds that were created in the early Eocene. Since water vapor is the only supporting substance used in Type II polar stratospheric clouds, the presence of water vapor in the lower stratosphere is necessary where in most situations the presence of water vapor in the lower stratosphere is rare. When methane is oxidized, a significant amount of water vapor is released. Another requirement for polar stratospheric clouds is cold temperatures to ensure condensation and cloud production. Polar stratospheric cloud production, since it requires the cold temperatures, is usually limited to nighttime and winter conditions. With this combination of wetter and colder conditions in the lower stratosphere, polar stratospheric clouds could have formed over wide areas in Polar Regions.

To test the polar stratospheric clouds effects on the Eocene climate, models were run comparing the effects of polar stratospheric clouds at the poles to an increase in atmospheric carbon dioxide. The polar stratospheric clouds had a warming effect on the poles, increasing temperatures by up to 20 °C in the winter months. A multitude of feedbacks also occurred in the models due to the polar stratospheric clouds' presence. Any ice growth was slowed immensely and would lead to any present ice melting. Only the poles were affected with the change in temperature and the tropics were unaffected, which with an increase in atmospheric carbon dioxide would also cause the tropics to increase in temperature. Due to the warming of the troposphere from the increased greenhouse effect of the polar stratospheric clouds, the stratosphere would cool and would potentially increase the amount of polar stratospheric clouds.

While the polar stratospheric clouds could explain the reduction of the equator to pole temperature gradient and the increased temperatures at the poles during the early Eocene, there are a few drawbacks to maintaining polar stratospheric clouds for an extended period of time. Separate model runs were used to determine the sustainability of the polar stratospheric clouds. It was determined that in order to maintain the lower stratospheric water vapor, methane would need to be continually released and sustained. In addition, the amounts of ice and condensation nuclei would need to be high in order for the polar stratospheric cloud to sustain itself and eventually expand.

Hyperthermals through the early Eocene 
During the warming in the early Eocene between 52 and 55 million years ago, there were a series of short-term changes of carbon isotope composition in the ocean. These hyperthermals led to increased perturbations in planktonic and benthic foraminifera, with a higher rate of sedimentation as a consequence of the warmer temperatures. Recent analysis of and research into these hyperthermals in the early Eocene has led to hypotheses that the hyperthermals are based on orbital parameters, in particular eccentricity and obliquity. The hyperthermals in the early Eocene, notably the Palaeocene–Eocene Thermal Maximum (PETM), the Eocene Thermal Maximum 2 (ETM2), and the Eocene Thermal Maximum 3 (ETM3), were analyzed and found that orbital control may have had a role in triggering the ETM2 and ETM3.

Greenhouse to icehouse climate 
The Eocene is not only known for containing the warmest period during the Cenozoic; it also marked the decline into an icehouse climate and the rapid expansion of the Antarctic ice sheet. The transition from a warming climate into a cooling climate began at around 49 million years ago. Isotopes of carbon and oxygen indicate a shift to a global cooling climate. The cause of the cooling has been attributed to a significant decrease of >2,000 ppm in atmospheric carbon dioxide concentrations. One proposed cause of the reduction in carbon dioxide during the warming to cooling transition was the azolla event. The increased warmth at the poles, the isolated Arctic basin during the early Eocene, and the significantly high amounts of carbon dioxide possibly led to azolla blooms across the Arctic Ocean. The isolation of the Arctic Ocean led to stagnant waters and as the azolla sank to the sea floor, they became part of the sediments and effectively sequestered the carbon. The ability for the azolla to sequester carbon is exceptional, and the enhanced burial of azolla could have had a significant effect on the world atmospheric carbon content and may have been the event to begin the transition into an ice house climate. Cooling after this event continued due to continual decrease in atmospheric carbon dioxide from organic productivity and weathering from mountain building.

Global cooling continued until there was a major reversal from cooling to warming indicated in the Southern Ocean at around 42–41 million years ago. Oxygen isotope analysis showed a large negative change in the proportion of heavier oxygen isotopes to lighter oxygen isotopes, which indicates an increase in global temperatures. This warming event is known as the Middle Eocene Climatic Optimum. The warming is considered to be primarily due to carbon dioxide increases, because carbon isotope signatures rule out major methane release during this short-term warming. The increase in atmospheric carbon dioxide is considered to be due to increased seafloor spreading rates between Australia and Antarctica and increased amounts of volcanism in the region. Another possible cause of atmospheric carbon dioxide increase could have been a sudden increase due to metamorphic release during the Himalayan orogeny; however, data on the exact timing of metamorphic release of atmospheric carbon dioxide is not well resolved in the data. Recent studies have mentioned, however, that the removal of the ocean between Asia and India could have released significant amounts of carbon dioxide. This warming is short lived, as benthic oxygen isotope records indicate a return to cooling at ~40 million years ago.

Cooling continued throughout the rest of the late Eocene into the Eocene-Oligocene transition. During the cooling period, benthic oxygen isotopes show the possibility of ice creation and ice increase during this later cooling. The end of the Eocene and beginning of the Oligocene is marked with the massive expansion of area of the Antarctic ice sheet that was a major step into the icehouse climate. Along with the decrease of atmospheric carbon dioxide reducing the global temperature, orbital factors in ice creation can be seen with 100,000-year and 400,000-year fluctuations in benthic oxygen isotope records. Another major contribution to the expansion of the ice sheet was the creation of the Antarctic Circumpolar Current. The creation of the Antarctic circumpolar current would isolate the cold water around the Antarctic, which would reduce heat transport to the Antarctic along with creating ocean gyres that result in the upwelling of colder bottom waters. The issue with this hypothesis of the consideration of this being a factor for the Eocene-Oligocene transition is the timing of the creation of the circulation is uncertain. For Drake Passage, sediments indicate the opening occurred ~41 million years ago while tectonics indicate that this occurred ~32 million years ago.

Flora
During the early-middle Eocene, forests covered most of the Earth including the poles. Tropical forests extended across much of modern Africa, South America, Central America, India, South-east Asia and China.  Paratropical forests grew over North America, Europe and Russia, with broad-leafed evergreen and broad-leafed deciduous forests at higher latitudes.

Polar forests were quite extensive. Fossils and even preserved remains of trees such as swamp cypress and dawn redwood from the Eocene have been found on Ellesmere Island in the Arctic.  Even at that time, Ellesmere Island was only a few degrees in latitude further south than it is today. Fossils of subtropical and even tropical trees and plants from the Eocene also have been found in Greenland and Alaska. Tropical rainforests grew as far north as northern North America and Europe.

Palm trees were growing as far north as Alaska and northern Europe during the early Eocene, although they became less abundant as the climate cooled. Dawn redwoods were far more extensive as well.

The earliest definitive Eucalyptus fossils were dated from 51.9 Mya, and were found in the Laguna del Hunco deposit in Chubut province in Argentina.

Cooling began mid-period, and by the end of the Eocene continental interiors had begun to dry, with forests thinning considerably in some areas. The newly evolved grasses were still confined to river banks and lake shores, and had not yet expanded into plains and savannas.

The cooling also brought seasonal changes. Deciduous trees, better able to cope with large temperature changes, began to overtake evergreen tropical species. By the end of the period, deciduous forests covered large parts of the northern continents, including North America, Eurasia and the Arctic, and rainforests held on only in equatorial South America, Africa, India and Australia.

Antarctica began the Eocene fringed with a warm temperate to sub-tropical rainforest. Pollen found in Prydz Bay from the Eocene suggest taiga forest existed there. It became much colder as the period progressed; the heat-loving tropical flora was wiped out, and by the beginning of the Oligocene, the continent hosted deciduous forests and vast stretches of tundra.

Fauna 
During the Eocene, plants and marine faunas became quite modern. Many modern bird orders first appeared in the Eocene. The Eocene oceans were warm and teeming with fish and other sea life.

Mammals

The oldest known fossils of most of the modern mammal orders appear within a brief period during the early Eocene. At the beginning of the Eocene, several new mammal groups arrived in North America. These modern mammals, like artiodactyls, perissodactyls, and primates, had features like long, thin legs, feet, and hands capable of grasping, as well as differentiated teeth adapted for chewing. Dwarf forms reigned. All the members of the new mammal orders were small, under 10 kg; based on comparisons of tooth size, Eocene mammals were only 60% of the size of the primitive Palaeocene mammals that preceded them. They were also smaller than the mammals that followed them. It is assumed that the hot Eocene temperatures favored smaller animals that were better able to manage the heat.

Both groups of modern ungulates (hoofed animals) became prevalent because of a major radiation between Europe and North America, along with carnivorous ungulates like Mesonyx. Early forms of many other modern mammalian orders appeared, including horses (most notably the Eohippus), bats, proboscidians (elephants), primates, rodents, and marsupials. Older primitive forms of mammals declined in variety and importance. Important Eocene land fauna fossil remains have been found in western North America, Europe, Patagonia, Egypt, and southeast Asia. Marine fauna are best known from South Asia and the southeast United States.

Established megafauna of the Eocene include the Uintatherium, Arsinoitherium, and brontotheres, in which the former two, unlike the latter, did not belong to ungulates but groups that became extinct shortly after their establishments.

Large terrestrial mammalian predators began to take form as the terrestrial carnivores like the Hyaenodon and Daphoenus (the earliest lineage of a once-successful predatory family known as bear dogs). Entelodonts meanwhile established themselves as some of the largest omnivores. The first nimravids, including Dinictis, established themselves as amongst the first feliforms to appear. Their groups became highly successful and continued to live past the Eocene.

Basilosaurus is a very well-known Eocene whale, but whales as a group had become very diverse during the Eocene, which is when the major transitions from being terrestrial to fully aquatic in cetaceans occurred. The first sirenians were evolving at this time, and would eventually evolve into the extant manatees and dugongs.

It is thought that millions of years after the Cretaceous-Paleogene extinction event, brain sizes of mammals now started to increase, "likely driven by a need for greater cognition in increasingly complex environments".

Birds

Eocene birds include some enigmatic groups with resemblances to modern forms, some of which continued from the Paleocene. Bird taxa of the Eocene include carnivorous psittaciforms, such as Messelasturidae, Halcyornithidae, large flightless forms such as Gastornis and Eleutherornis, long legged falcon Masillaraptor, ancient galliforms such as Gallinuloides, putative rail relatives of the family Songziidae, various pseudotooth birds such as Gigantornis, the ibis relative Rhynchaeites, primitive swifts of the genus Aegialornis, and primitive penguins such as Archaeospheniscus and Inkayacu.

Reptiles
Reptile fossils from this time, such as fossils of pythons and turtles, are abundant.

Insects and arachnids
Several rich fossil insect faunas are known from the Eocene, notably the Baltic amber found mainly along the south coast of the Baltic Sea, amber from the Paris Basin, France, the Fur Formation, Denmark, and the Bembridge Marls from the Isle of Wight, England. Insects found in Eocene deposits mostly belong to genera that exist today, though their range has often shifted since the Eocene. For instance the bibionid genus Plecia is common in fossil faunas from presently temperate areas, but only lives in the tropics and subtropics today.

Gallery

See also 
 Bolca in Italy
 List of fossil sites (with link directory)
 London Clay
 Messel pit in Germany
 Wadi El Hitan in Egypt

Notes

References

Further reading 
 Ogg, Jim; June, 2004, Overview of Global Boundary Stratotype Sections and Points (GSSP's) Global Stratotype Sections and Points Accessed April 30, 2006.
Stanley, Steven M. Earth System History. New York: W.H. Freeman and Company, 1999.

External links 

PaleoMap Project
Paleos Eocene page
PBS Deep Time: Eocene
Eocene and Oligocene Fossils
The UPenn Fossil Forest Project, focusing on the Eocene polar forests in Ellesmere Island, Canada
Basilosaurus Primitive Eocene Whales
Basilosaurus - The plesiosaur that wasn't....
Detailed maps of Tertiary Western North America
Map of Eocene Earth
Eocene Microfossils: 60+ images of Foraminifera
Eocene Epoch. (2011). In Encyclopædia Britannica. Retrieved from Eocene Epoch | geochronology

 
Geological epochs
Paleogene geochronology